Austral Entomology (formerly Australian Journal of Entomology) is a peer-reviewed scientific journal published by Wiley on behalf of the Australian Entomological Society. The editor-in-chief is Dr Richard V Glatz.

Austral Entomology is the flagship publication of the Society, and it promotes the study of the biology, ecology, taxonomy and control of insects and arachnids within a southern hemisphere context.

External links 
 

Quarterly journals
English-language journals
Wiley-Blackwell academic journals
Entomology journals and magazines
Publications established in 1962
Academic journals associated with learned and professional societies of Australia